The Flames was a musical rock group from Durban in South Africa. They performed across London in the late 1960s, where they met Brian Jones, Keith Moon, Keith Richards, Jerry Garcia, Miles Davis and Carl Wilson. They later traveled to Los Angeles to record an album for The Beach Boys' record label Brother Records, for which they changed their name to The Flame.

Biography

The Beginning of The Flames 
Prior to the forming of the band, Steve Fataar would enter talent contests at the Admiral hotel and do well. According to a friend of his, Bing Kinsey, "He continued entering these contests which put his mother in bit of a bother as she had to drive him there. I recall that on one occasion, Steve had heard a song by Cliff Richard just once – I’m not sure whether it was "Gee Whizz It's You" or "I'm Looking out the Window". I knew the song and taught it to him. That night he sang it at the talent contest and won." Eventually, Steve's brother, Edries Fataar, would join him.

The Flames formally formed in 1962 by guitarist Steve Fataar, bassist Brother Fataar (real name Edries Fataar), with drummer George Fabre, and guitarist Eugene Champion. Before a gig, Fabre withdrew. The urgent need of a drummer was resolved with Ricky Fataar.

Kinsey added, "This became the line-up for the next year or so. The group concentrated on instrumentals doing covers of The Shadows’ and The Ventures’ material. Steve was the main vocalist doing most of the singing with Eugene and Brother providing harmonies. Eugene and Brother did the occasional song including Baby My Heart", a song recorded by The Crickets and The Shadows.

Because of work commitments, Eugene Champion decided to leave the group in 1963. He was replaced by Edries Fredericks. Fredericks' vocal abilities led the band to include more vocalization. "Edries had a very soulful sound and this began the transformation within the group. We began importing records from overseas and also gained access to some recordings by the early soul singers and groups including Marvin Gaye, Solomon Burke and James Brown through friends." - Kinsey adds.

The Edries Fredericks Era 
In early 1963, the group signed a recording contract with Trutone Records and made their first recording at a studio in Durban run by John and Margaret Cahill. Two songs were recorded; “I Saw Her Standing There”, sometimes referred to as “Just Seventeen”, and “Misery”. Trutone decided not to release it, but heavily promoted The Meteors’ version of “I Saw Her Standing There”, which became a huge hit in South Africa.

In April, the group traveled to Johannesburg to record four tracks. The first release from this recording session consisted of two instrumentals, "Mr. Moto" and "Dixie" on the Rave label. Mr. Moto premiered on Eric Egan’s morning program during the new releases segment between 7:00 and 7:15. The second single was released soon after with "Maniac" and "Modern Casanova". The label showed the artists as Steve and The Flames as Steve sang lead on both songs. In December of that year, The Flames toured Port Elizabeth. After the gigs, The Flames drove to Johannesburg to record their first album.

The band's first album was recorded over 3 days with Art Heatley as producer and Dave Erbstoesser as the sound engineer. "White Cliffs of Dover" was the song that the band thought would be the hit from the album. The only track from this album to get any air play on the radio was "Pretty Woman". It was played a few times by Peter Lotus on the evening music show. This album has been out of print but has been re-issued by Fresh Music as a part of a CD collection.

1964 was the year that the group really started to gel into that cohesive soulful group and to make great strides on the national scene. It was the year that they won The Battle of The Bands contest and Ricky was awarded the Best Drummer title. The group toured throughout the country and began to establish their popularity in the Cape, making two tours to Cape Town  performing at The Luxarama, as well as touring the Eastern Cape with shows in Port Elizabeth, Uitenhage and East London.

The home scene was not forgotten with the group performing at places such as Stanger, Verulem, Tongaat, Pietermaritzburg and Richmond. While songs by The Beatles featured prominently in their repertoire, The Flames showed their versatility by including songs by The Rolling Stones, The Beach Boys, Solomon Burke, Otis Redding and the British stars such as The Fortunes. Their popularity increased and more regular gigs came up with regular performances at Upstairs at the Downstairs and later at the Alfresco.

Although the group was very popular and had many bookings, the earnings were not good and expenses to be met to keep the group’s instrumentation modern and up-to-date. Edries Fredericks was in a serious relationship and became concerned that he would not be able to afford to provide for a family. He began to look for something that would provide a regular decent income and decided to leave the group in March 1966.

The Blondie Chaplin Era 
Mitchell "Baby" Duval replaced Edries Fredericks in 1966. In his short tenure in the band, he featured on the group's second album, That's Enough. Blondie Chaplin, a young singer making a name for himself as a member of the group The Kittens, replaced Duval in the band.

To quote Kinsey, "Blondie brought another dimension to the group with his brand of soulful singing. He also developed into a great guitarist who would share the lead guitar work with Steve.

It was this new line-up that recorded the Soul albums which were to produce the iconic Flames’ song "For Your Precious Love" featuring the famous introduction by Steve and the fabulous singing of the young Blondie. The song had been part of the group’s repertoire since they heard Oscar Tony Jr. in 1967."

According to Steve Fataar, "At the time of recording Burning Soul!, we were a tight band that had been performing continuously, so the recordings were pretty much live. They were done on a four-track analogue recorder and the sessions were quite cheerful, confident and sans stress. Essentially it was a band adventure. Soulfire was recorded similarly but there was more overdubs and brass tracking added,” he says. “All this was a learning curve and rather exciting — consider that Ricky and Blondie were only 14 and 15 years old at this time."

Material for a live album was recorded at the Al Fresco in Durban by Graham Beggs. The recordings weren't released and currently hasn't located, though they're probably in the hands of Graham Beggs.

In 1965, The Flames entertained the idea of trying their luck overseas.  It didn't work out then, but the idea never left them. It seemed as if there was no real future for the group because they couldn't get the exposure that other groups seemed to be getting. This influenced them to perform in a number of venues in London and also record a song called "Streamliner". In 1969, their performances gained the attention of The Beach Boys (Particularly Carl Wilson and Al Jardine) and The Bee Gees.

The Beach Boys made The Flames an offer to join their Brother label and move to America; which they did. A decision was made to change the name of the group to The Flame to avoid confusion with another band. A self titled album was released in 1970. It was the first ever rock album recorded in quadraphonic sound and the only non-Beach Boys album on the Brother records label. It was produced by Carl Wilson. One track, "See The Light" reached the Billboard Top 100. The group developed quite a following as they performed at different venues mainly in the West Coast. The group at one point, paid a visit to South Africa and performed in Durban and Pietermaritzburg.

A second album was recorded but was never released. Attempts have been made, and are still being made, to finally release this album.

Here is a listing of the tracks that were recorded for this album:

 Mother Of The Century
 Sigh Baby Sigh
 High Overhead
 Sunny Skies
 Thank Someone
 Seven Sisters
 Have You Ever Been Happy
 Henry's Son
 Sweet Jane
 I'm A Man (Outtake)
 Hello! (Outtake)
 Everybody (Outtake)

Both Steve and Brother were unhappy with the situation in the US. Brother left to England and Steve to South Africa, thus disbanding the group essentially.

Post-break up 
In 1972, Ricky Fataar and Blondie Chaplin joined The Beach Boys. Blondie’s role in The Beach Boys was as a bass guitarist and vocalist. He sang lead on a number of tracks on two Beach Boys studio albums and the live Beach Boys in Concert album. The track Sail On, Sailor is most associated with him. Blondie left the group in 1973 and worked with a number of other musicians, performing live as well as on records, including members of The Band and The Byrds. He also recorded two solo albums. Blondie’s talents came to the attention of The Rolling Stones and he's toured with the group for over 10 years, as well as appearing on some of their studio recordings. He is also a member of Skollie, a band formed with fellow South Africans, Keith Lentin and Anton Fig.

Ricky remained with the Beach Boys for 3 years before branching out into other fields. In 1978, he featured in the film All You Need Is Cash, a spoof on the Beatles. He played the role Stig O’Hara, a character based on George Harrison. He also featured on The Rutles' two albums. He became a producer and his production of Renée Geyer's So Lucky, which also featured Blondie on vocals, was his first success in the role. He later emigrated to Australia where he produced a number of successful artists including Tim Finn, Kate Ceberano, Dragon, and Wendy Matthews. Ricky wrote the scores for a few Australian films. Ricky met Bonnie Raitt in 1978 and has since accompanied her on many tours as well as appearing on most of her later recordings.

Steve Fataar and Edries Fredericks later teamed up with some other artists to form In Formation.

In the 1970's, almost all The Flames’ masters were destroyed in a fire. It is only through the restoration done by Bas Mollenkramer from physical records that we have almost the complete Flames recordings available.

Brother Fataar died on September 10, 1978 and Baby Duval died on an unknown date.

The Flames have reunited a few times. In 2000 and 2011, the three surviving members of the band reunited for a few shows in South Africa.

Steve Fataar died on January 18, 2020, having performed at a show hours before. It's believed he died in his sleep from lung complications.

Members 

 Steve Fataar - lead guitar, lead vocals (1962-1970, 2000, 2011) (March 14, 1943-January 18th, 2020 (aged 76))
 Featured on all recordings and the 2000 and 2011 reunions.
 Edries "Brother" Fataar - bass, backing and occasional lead vocals (1962-1970) (July 6, 1945-September 10, 1978, Amsterdam, the Netherlands (aged 33))
 Featured on all recordings, except the reunions.
 George Fabre - drums (1962)
 Not featured on any recordings.
 There was some dispute over when Fabre left the group. Some say it was in 1964, with George and Eugene Champion leaving in a similar time frame. Other sources say he left in 1963. According to Bing Kinsey, the lineup with Eugene Champion and Ricky Fataar lasted about a year. It was ultimately resolved that he left in 1962 and a year before Champion.
 Eugene Champion - rhythm guitar (1962-1963)
 Not featured on any recordings.
 Ricky Fataar - drums, backing and occasional lead vocals (1962-1970, 2000, 2011) (September 5, 1952-)
 Featured on all recordings and the 2000 and 2011 reunions.
 Edries Fredericks - rhythm guitar, backing and occasional lead vocals (1963-1966)
 Featured on most singles and Ummm! Ummm! Oh Yeah!!!.
 Mitchell "Baby" Duval - rhythm guitar, backing and occasional lead vocals (1966-1967) (deceased)
 Featured on That's Enough and some singles.
 Blondie Chaplin - rhythm guitar, lead vocals (1967-1970, 2000, 2011) (July 7, 1951-)
 Featured from Burning Soul! to The Flame, some stray recordings, and the 2000 and 2011 reunions.
Simon Pontin - bass guitar (2000)
Timeline

Discography

Singles 

"Dixie" b/w "Mr. Moto" (Rave 45 R219) (1963)
Steve Fataar - lead guitar
Brother Fataar - bass guitar
Ricky Fataar - drums
Edries Fredericks - rhythm guitar
"Maniac" b/w "Modern Casanova" (Rave 45 R220) (1963)
Note: Credited to "Steve & the Flames"
Steve Fataar - lead guitar, lead vocals
Brother Fataar - bass guitar
Ricky Fataar - drums
Edries Fredericks - rhythm guitar
"Is It You" b/w "Nobody Tells Me (What To Do)" (Rave 45 R239) (1964)
Steve Fataar - lead guitar, lead vocals
Brother Fataar - bass guitar
Ricky Fataar - drums
Edries Fredericks - rhythm guitar
"One Of These Days" b/w "Don&apos;t Play That Song" (Rave 45 R276) (July 1965)
Steve Fataar - lead guitar, secondary vocals (track 1)
Brother Fataar - bass guitar
Ricky Fataar - drums
Edries Fredericks - rhythm guitar, lead vocals
"Like A Baby" b/w "Glory Of Love" (Rave R285) (August 1966)
Steve Fataar - lead guitar, lead vocals (track 2)
Brother Fataar - bass guitar
Ricky Fataar - drums
Baby Duval - rhythm guitar, lead vocals (track 1)
"He&apos;ll Only Hurt You" b/w "You Don&apos;t Have To Say You Love Me" (Rave R286) (August 1966)
Note: Credited to "Zane Adams & the Flames"
Steve Fataar - lead guitar
Brother Fataar - bass guitar
Ricky Fataar - drums
Baby Duval - rhythm guitar
Zane Adams - lead vocals
"If You Need Me" b/w "You Better Move On" (Rave R292) (February 1967) 
Steve Fataar - lead guitar, lead vocals 
Brother Fataar - bass guitar
Ricky Fataar - drums
Edries Fredericks - rhythm guitar, secondary vocals (track 2)
"Respect" b/w "Down In The Valley" (Rave R295) (March 1967) 
Steve Fataar - lead guitar, lead vocals (track 2) 
Brother Fataar - bass guitar
Ricky Fataar - drums
Baby Duval - rhythm guitar, lead vocals (track 1)
"Streamliner" b/w "Follow the Sun" (1968)
Note: "Follow the Sun" was recorded by The Several. The Flames were not featured on its recording.
Steve Fataar - lead guitar (track 1), lead vocals (track 1)
Brother Fataar - bass guitar (track 1)
Ricky Fataar - drums (track 1)
Blondie Chaplin - rhythm guitar (track 1)
"Lost" b/w "Restless" (Rave R301) (April 1968)
Steve Fataar - lead guitar, lead vocals (track 1)
Brother Fataar - bass guitar
Ricky Fataar - drums
Blondie Chaplin - rhythm guitar, lead vocals (track 2)
"For Your Precious Love" b/w "A Place In The Sun" (Rave R307) (August 1968)
Steve Fataar - lead guitar, spoken word (track 1)
Brother Fataar - bass guitar
Ricky Fataar - drums, lead vocals (track 2)
Blondie Chaplin - rhythm guitar, lead vocals (track 1)
"Don&apos;t Make Your Children Pay" b/w "Purple Haze" (Rave R309) (September 1968)
Steve Fataar - lead guitar, lead vocals (track 2)
Brother Fataar - bass guitar
Ricky Fataar - drums
Blondie Chaplin - rhythm guitar, lead vocals (track 1)
"Can&apos;t Help Myself" b/w "Purple Raindrops" (Rave R310) (September 1968)
Steve Fataar - lead guitar
Brother Fataar - bass guitar
Ricky Fataar - drums, lead vocals (track 2)
Baby Duval - rhythm guitar, lead vocals (track 1)
"Tell It Like It Is" b/w "Don&apos;t Fight It" (Trutone TOS539) (April 1969)
Steve Fataar - lead guitar, lead vocals (track 1)
Brother Fataar - bass guitar
Ricky Fataar - drums
Blondie Chaplin - rhythm guitar, lead vocals (track 2)
"See The Light" b/w "Get Your Mind Made Up" (Brother 45-3500) (October 1970)
Steve Fataar - lead guitar, secondary vocals
Brother Fataar - bass guitar
Ricky Fataar - drums
Blondie Chaplin - rhythm guitar, lead vocals
"Another Day Like Heaven" b/w "I&apos;m So Happy" (Brother D45-3501) (January 1971)
Steve Fataar - lead guitar, secondary vocals
Brother Fataar - bass guitar
Ricky Fataar - drums
Blondie Chaplin - rhythm guitar, lead vocals
"If You Need Me" b/w "You Got It Made" (Rave TOS958) (January 1974)
Steve Fataar - lead guitar, lead vocals (track 1), secondary vocals (track 2)
Brother Fataar - bass guitar
Ricky Fataar - drums
Edries Fredericks - rhythm guitar (track 1)
Blondie Chaplin - rhythm guitar (track 2), lead vocals (track 2)

In the recording session that produced "Nobody" and "Is It You?" two other tracks were recorded, "Boys" and "Claudette". According to Rob Allingham from Gallos in 2002, he found the tracks and was intending to release them. They were included on a re-release of Ummm! Ummm! Oh Yeah!!!.

Studio albums 
Ummm! Ummm! Oh Yeah!!! (1965)
Steve Fataar - lead guitar, lead vocals (tracks 1-5, 7-12)
Brother Fataar - bass guitar, lead vocals (track 6)
Ricky Fataar - drums
Edries Fredericks - rhythm guitar, secondary vocals (tracks 6, 9-10)
That's Enough (1967)
Steve Fataar - lead guitar, lead vocals (tracks 1-2, 4-5, 8-9, 12), backing vocals (track 10)
Brother Fataar - bass guitar
Ricky Fataar - drums, lead vocals (track 7)
Baby Duval - rhythm guitar, lead vocals (tracks 3, 6, 11)
It was speculated if Duval ever appeared on a recording. However, Steve Fataar confirmed that he did on some of this album.
Burning Soul! (1967)
Steve Fataar - lead guitar, lead vocals (tracks 4, 10, 12), secondary vocals (track 1)
Brother Fataar - bass guitar
Ricky Fataar - drums, lead vocals (track 9), secondary vocals (track 11)
Blondie Chaplin - rhythm guitar, lead vocals (tracks 1-3, 5-8, 11)
Soulfire!! (1968)
Steve Fataar - lead guitar, lead vocals (tracks 1, 5, 9-11), spoken word (track 3)
Brother Fataar - bass guitar
Ricky Fataar - drums, lead vocals (track 8)
Blondie Chaplin - rhythm guitar, lead vocals (tracks 2-4, 6-7)
The Flame (1970)
Steve Fataar - lead guitar, lead vocals (track 5), secondary vocals (tracks 1-4, 6-11)
Brother Fataar - bass guitar, backing vocals (tracks 1-11)
Ricky Fataar - drums, backing vocals (tracks 1-11)
Blondie Chaplin - rhythm guitar, lead vocals (tracks 1-4, 6-11), secondary vocals (track 5)

Live albums 

 Reunion - Shongweni - September 2000 (2021)
 Steve Fataar - lead guitar, lead vocals
Ricky Fataar - drums
Blondie Chaplin - rhythm guitar, lead vocals
Simon Pontin - bass guitar
unknown keyboardist
Phil Manzanera - guitar (guest)

Backing Albums 

 Soul Meeting!! (1968)
 Steve Fataar - lead guitar (tracks 1-2, 4, 6, 10-11)
Brother Fataar - bass guitar (tracks 1-2, 4, 6, 10-11)
Ricky Fataar - drums (tracks 1-2, 4, 6, 10-11)
Blondie Chaplin - rhythm guitar (tracks 1-2, 4, 6, 10-11)
The Flames backed Una Valli, though the band only featured on six of the album's twelve songs.

Compilation Albums 

 The Best Of The Flames (1969)
 Ball of Flames (1970)
 The Best Of The Flames (1994)

References

South African rock music groups
Musicians from Durban
Musical groups established in 1963
1963 establishments in South Africa